Motormouth Variations is a remix album by Bob Ostertag, released in July 2011 by Sandwell District.

Track listing

Personnel
Adapted from the Motormouth Variations liner notes.

Musicians
 Bob Ostertag – sampler
 Rrose – remixing

Production and design
 Matt Colton – mastering

Release history

References

External links 
 

2011 remix albums
Bob Ostertag albums
Sandwell District remix albums